Hidden Valley is a rural locality in the Livingstone Shire, Queensland, Australia.

Geography 
The Rockhampton-Yeppoon Road (as Yeppoon Road) runs along the northern boundary.

History 
Jangga, also known as Yangga, is a language of Central Queensland. The Jangga language region includes the landscape within the local government boundaries of the Etheridge Shire Council.

References 

Shire of Livingstone
Localities in Queensland